Odostomia bernardi is a species of sea snail, a marine gastropod mollusc in the family Pyramidellidae, the pyrams and their allies.

Description
The gradually tapering shell varies in size between 1.4 mm and 1.6 mm. It is white and slightly transparent.

Distribution
This species occurs in the following locations:
 Azores Exclusive Economic Zone
 European waters (ERMS scope)

References

External links
 
 To CLEMAM
 To Encyclopedia of Life
 To World Register of Marine Species

bernardi
Gastropods described in 1998
Molluscs of the Atlantic Ocean